Raphael Hartl (born 26 September 1975) is an Austrian rower. He competed at the 2000 Summer Olympics and the 2004 Summer Olympics.

References

1975 births
Living people
Austrian male rowers
Olympic rowers of Austria
Rowers at the 2000 Summer Olympics
Rowers at the 2004 Summer Olympics
Rowers from Linz